Two in Revolt is a 1936 American drama film directed by Glenn Tryon. Released on April 3, 1936, by RKO Radio Pictures, the film stars John Arledge, Louise Latimer, and Moroni Olsen, and features Lightning the dog and Warrior the horse.

Production
The working title for the film was Thoroughbreds All. Portions of the film were shot on location in the mountains near Sedona, Arizona. Dog trainer Earl Johnson wrapped his German Shepherd Lightning in four blankets at night, with just his nose exposed, when temperatures fell to 30 degrees below zero and water froze indoors.

Cast
 John Arledge as John Woods
 Louise Latimer as Gloria Benton
 Moroni Olsen as Cyrus Benton
 Harry Jans as Crane
 Willie Best as Eph
 Murray Alper as Andy
 Ethan Laidlaw as Bill Donlan
 Emmett Vogan as Mason
 Max Wagner as Davis
 Lightning the Dog as Himself
 Warrior the Horse as Himself

References

External links

 Lightning in Two in Revolt (Margaret Herrick Library Digital Collections, Academy of Motion Picture Arts and Sciences)
 John Arledge and Warrior in Two in Revolt (Margaret Herrick Library Digital Collections, Academy of Motion Picture Arts and Sciences)

1936 drama films
1936 films
Films produced by Samuel J. Briskin
RKO Pictures films
Films directed by Glenn Tryon
American drama films
1930s American films